Franjo Tuđman Bridge may refer to:
Franjo Tuđman Bridge (Čapljina)
Franjo Tuđman Bridge (Dubrovnik)
Franjo Tuđman Bridge (Osijek)